The Anmatyerr, also spelt Anmatyerre, Anmatjera, Anmatjirra, Amatjere and other variations) are an Aboriginal Australian people of the Northern Territory, who speak one of the Upper Arrernte languages.

Language

Anmatyerr is divided into Eastern and Western dialects, both dialects of Upper Arrernte.

Country
He specifies its central features as encompassing the Forster Range, Mount Leichhardt (Arnka), Coniston, Stuart Bluff Range to the east of West Bluff; the Hann and Reynolds Ranges (Arwerlt Atwaty); the Burt Plain north of Rembrandt Rocks and Connor Well. Their eastern frontier went as far as Woodgreen. To the northeast, their borders lay around central Mount Stuart (Amakweng) and Harper Springs.

Communities
Anmatyerr communities located within the region include Nturiya (Old Ti Tree Station), Ti-Tree Pmara Jutunta (6 Mile), Willowra, Laramba (Napperby Station) and Alyuen. What is today known as the Anmatyerre region has significant overlap with Warlpiri, Arrernte and Alyawarr language communities. Many people come from two or three different language groups. As a specialist in Arandic culture and language T. G. H Strehlow also worked with Anmatyerr people throughout his career, recording much of their ceremonial traditions.

Alternative names
 Anmatjara
 Imatjera
 Janmadjara/Janmadjari (Warlpiri exonym)
 Janmatjiri. (Pintupi exonym)
 Nmatjera
 Unmatjera (mainly an Aranda exonym)
 Urmitchee
 Yanmedjara, Yanmadjari.

Notable people
 Gwoya Jungarai, aka "One Pound Jimmy", was the first named Aboriginal person to appear on an Australian postage stamp, in 1950.
 Clifford Possum Tjapaltjarri and Tim Leura Tjapaltjarri, stepsons of Gwoya Jungarai, were Anmatyerr artists credited as leaders of the Contemporary Indigenous Australian art movement.
 Emily Kngwarreye was an Anmatyerr artist who lived at Utopia community.
 Kathleen Petyarre, Gloria Petyarre, and Jeanna Petyarre and two other sisters, nieces of Emily Kngwarreye, are well-known Alyawarre / Eastern Anmatyerre artists, also at Utopia.
 Minnie Pwerle was an Alyawarre / Anmatyerre artist.

Notes

Citations

Sources

External links 
 Northern Territory Govt
 Anmatjerre Community Government Council

Aboriginal peoples of the Northern Territory